The Canon of Curaçao is a list of fifty themes (called "windows") that chronologically summarizes the history of Curaçao. In the windows 50 subjects are described in approximately 400 words each. Complementing the Canon of the Netherlands and its regional canons, the Canon of Curaçao was compiled on the initiative of the General Faculty of the University of Curaçao (UoC), for the purpose of history education.

The committee members are:
 Dr. R. M. Allen, anthropologist, part-time lecturer at UoC
 Drs. E. Baetens, former geography teacher and FMS employee
 Drs. W. Kamps, former staff member of the General Faculty of UoC
 Drs. M. Scriwanek, director of the NAC
 Drs. R. Sille, former history teacher and rector of the Kolegio Alejandro Paula (KAP)
 Drs. H. Vlinkervleugel, chairman of the Curaçao association of history teachers
 Drs. I. Witteveen, former director of the National Archaeological Anthropological Museum (NAAM) and former FMS employee

The 50 windows

See also
 Canon of the Netherlands
 
 Canon of Friesland
 
 Canon of Groningen

References

Dutch history timelines
Historiography of the Netherlands
History of Curaçao